Michael Rochford (born 1890) was an Irish hurler who played as a right corner-back for the Limerick senior team.

Born in Limerick, Rochford first played competitive hurling in his youth. He made his first impression on the inter-county scene when he joined the Limerick senior team during a golden age between 1918 and 1923. Rochford went on to play a key role for Limerick for a brief period, and won one All-Ireland medal and one Munster medal.

At club level he was a four-time championship medallist with Claughaun.

Honours

Player

Claughaun
Limerick Senior Club Hurling Championship (4): 1914, 1915, 1916, 1918

Limerick
All-Ireland Senior Hurling Championship (1): 1918
Munster Senior Hurling Championship (1): 1918

References

1890 births
Claughaun hurlers
Limerick inter-county hurlers
All-Ireland Senior Hurling Championship winners
Year of death missing